The 1987 NCAA Division I Women's Lacrosse Championship was the sixth annual single-elimination tournament to determine the national championship for Division I National Collegiate Athletic Association (NCAA) women's college lacrosse. The championship game was played at Byrd Stadium in College Park, Maryland during May 1987.

Penn State defeated Temple, 7–6, in the final to win their first championship.

The leading scorers for the tournament, both with 9 goals, were Karen Geromini, from New Hampshire, and Tami Worley, from Penn State. The Most Outstanding Player trophy was not awarded this year.

Qualification
All NCAA Division I women's lacrosse programs were eligible for this championship. In the end, 6 teams contested this tournament, an increase of two from the previous year.

Tournament bracket

Tournament outstanding players 
Beth Stokes, Penn State
Chris Vitale, Penn State
Mandee Moore, Temple

See also 
 NCAA Division I Women's Lacrosse Championship
 NCAA Division III Women's Lacrosse Championship
 1987 NCAA Division I Men's Lacrosse Championship

References

NCAA Division I Women's Lacrosse Championship
NCAA Division I Women's Lacrosse Championship
NCAA Women's Lacrosse Championship